Pakistan Air Force Airmen Academy Korangi Creek is "Home of Airmen". It was PAF Base which imparts only technical training to Aero Apprentices and training of non-technical trades was going on another PAF Bases, so PAF needed to train all Airmen at one place. In 2019, It was established as an Academy in which training of all trades is planned. It was a momentous occasion in the history of Pakistan Air Force, as the Air Chief laid the foundation stone of PAF Airmen Academy at PAF Base Korangi Creek Monday.

To mark this historic event, a ceremony was held, in which Air Chief Marshal Mujahid Anwar Khan, Chief of the Air Staff Pakistan Air Force unveiled the plaque of this unique institution. Addressing at the occasion, the Air Chief said that PAF has always focused on imparting quality training to the airmen, who are considered to be the backbone of PAF human resource. He further said that existing airmen training model needed revamping to make it at par with PAF Academy Asghar Khan, which is a premier training institution of officers’ cadre. He added that in this centralized institution, airmen of various trades and expertise would be trained in technical and non-technical disciplines under one umbrella. The Air Chief reiterated his resolve of making it a reputed institution which would also offer quality training to the airmen from friendly air forces. High ranking civil and defence forces officers and a large number of PAF personnel attended the ceremony.

History

Royal Air Force
The facility was established by the Royal Air Force in 1923. Located in a beach area of Karachi, the primary role of the facility was to provide the embarkation and disembarkation facilities to the RAF and other British personnel arriving by civil or military amphibious aircraft, and also to handle receipts and dispatch of cargo on these aircraft.

Korangi Creek also served as a logistic base for the aircraft repair depot at Drigh Road through the supply depot there. Aircraft engines and spare parts that were brought to Korangi Creek by amphibious aircraft were eventually transferred to Drigh Road ( now Shara-e-Faisal) to be made use of. Much of the equipment serviced by the repair depot was channeled through Korangi to Bombay to support RAF units all over British Raj. After the independence of Pakistan, the station continued to be commanded and manned by RAF personnel till 1949.

Pakistan Air Force
In December 1949, the first RPAF station commander was Wing Commander A.R.K. Malik. At this stage, it was decided to make Korangi a technical training base for officers and airmen of the PAF. In April 1951, the first technical school was established at this station, and was named the School of Aeronautics (SOA). The school was inaugurated by the Prime Minister Liaquat Ali Khan. The SOA soon established its reputation as a successful training program in the PAF and abroad, and a large number of foreign countries started sending their air technicians to the base for basic training. In 1963, the School of Electronics (SOE) was moved from PAF Station Malir to Korangi Creek to become the sister institution of the SOA.

Other
The Academy is implicitly used for the development of the Unmanned Aerial Vehicle. Pakistan's Integrated Defence Systems (IDS) and the military scientists from College of Aeronautical Engineering and Pakistan Navy Engineering College have been engaged in the research and development of UAVs and aerospace related technologies. Now, the Pakistan Air Force is also producing EASA (European Aviation Safety Agency) qualified technicians. Now, they are among the world's most talented technicians and engineers. EASA courses are being taught in PAF Airmen Academy Korangi Creek.

See also
 Korangi Creek
 Faisal Cantonment
 Karachi Naval Dockyard
 Military installations in Karachi
 PAF Base Faisal
 PAF Base Masroor

References

External links
http://www.dailytimes.com.pk/default.asp?page=2009\06\09\story_9-6-2009_pg12_11
http://theasiandefence.blogspot.com/2009/04/flying-high-in-korangi-made-in-pakistan.html
http://www.dawn.com/wps/wcm/connect/dawn-content-library/dawn/news/pakistan/drones-made-in-pakistan

World War II sites in India
Airports in Karachi
Pakistan Air Force bases
Military installations in Karachi